The IEEE Richard Harold Kaufmann Award is a Technical Field Award of the IEEE that was established by the IEEE Board of Directors in 1986.  This award is presented for outstanding contributions in industrial systems engineering.

The award may be presented to an individual, or team of up to three people.

Recipients of this award receive a bronze medal, certificate, and honorarium

Recipients 
 2020: Kouki Matsuse
 2019: , "For pioneering contributions to high power converters and drives for highspeed-train and industrial applications" His innovations were crucial for MAGLEV and Japanese bullet trains.
 2018: Greg Charles Stone, "For advancements in rotating machines insulation evaluation and testing"
 2017: Erling Hesla, "For leadership in establishing the fundamentals for the protection and safe operation of industrial power systems"
 2016: G.S. Peter Castle, "For developments of applied electrostatic devices and processes in industry, agriculture, and environmental protection"
 2015: Charles John Mozina, "For contributions to the electrical protection of synchronous generators"
 2014: Robert D. Lorenz, "For contributions to the development of methodologies and sensors for precision control of electric motor drives and coordinated drive systems"
 2013: Kaushik Rajashekara, "For contributions to the advancement of electrical systems in transportation for higher efficiency and lower emissions"
 2012: John P. Nelson, "For leadership in grounding and protection design and the advancement of the electrical safety culture"
 2011: David Doyle Shipp, "For contributions to the design, analysis and protection of electrical power systems and personnel in industrial and commercial applications"
 2010: Gerald T. Heydt, "For contributions to electric power quality, and transmission and distribution engineering"
 2009: Ronald G. Harley, "For contributions to monitoring, control, and optimization of electrical processes, including electrical machines and power networks"
 2008: Hirofumi Akagi, "For pioneering contributions to the theory of instantaneous reactive power in threephase circuits, and its applications to power conditioning"
 2007: Md. Azizur Rahman
 2006: George Younkin
 2005: A. P. Meliopoulos
 2004: Richard L. Nailen
 2003: Edward L. Owen
 2002:	H. Landis Floyd, II
 2001: Louie J. Powell
 2000: Alton Dewitt Patton
 1999: Baldwin Bridger, Jr.
 1998: James A. Oliver
 1997: Thomas E. Sparling
 1996: Marcus O. Durham
 1995: N. Shan Griffith
 1994: Daniel J. Love
 1993: George W. Walsh
 1992: Kao Chen
 1991: John R. Dunki-Jacobs
 1990: Rene Castenschiold
 1989: Bernard W. Whittington
 1988: Walter C. Huening, Jr.

References

External links 
 IEEE Richard Harold Kaufmann Award page at IEEE

Richard Harold Kaufmann Award